Rocco “Roc” Gardner (born 21 June 1979) is a British entrepreneur and musician based in Las Vegas, Nevada. He is the owner of the experiential brand Escape and a production company, Escape Productions LLC in New York City.

Background
He was born Roland Gardner on 21 June 1979 in London. He is the godson of the late Jaime Ortiz-Patino, owner of Valderrama Golf Club and former chairman of the World Bridge Association.

Early career
Gardner grew up playing the piano from an early age, giving rise to his career as a performing musician and music industry businessman.

In 2004, while touring Europe with his band Chiller, he founded Sidewalk 7 Ltd. in the United Kingdom. At the time described by The Times as the next Richard Branson, Gardner initially created Sidewalk 7 as a company to act as the vehicle for his projects and creative ventures. It expanded to a record label, an artist management company and event production agency. Sidewalk 7 Limited released over thirty titles internationally and successfully managed campaigns on behalf of artists both at home and abroad in the United States, eventually taking the company and its CEO to New York City in 2009.

Escape
In 2009, Gardner founded Escape Productions LLC, starting with an experiential music festival called "Escape to New York".

Escape to Festivals
 Escape to New York, in collaboration with the UK's Secret Garden Party, on the Shinnecock Reservation (August 2011) with Patti Smith, Edward Sharpe & The Magnetic Zeros headlining.
 Escape LA in Palm Springs (April 2012) with Thom Yorke headlining.
 Escape to Montauk in Montauk, New York (August 2012) with Albert Hammond JR headlining.

Rancho V
Escape's west coast headquarters is based at Rancho V, a private 140-acre ranch and recording complex on the outskirts of Pioneertown, California situated near Palm Springs and the renowned music venue Pappy & Harriet's. It is approximately 15 miles from Joshua Tree National Park. It functions as a creative center and recording complex for musicians, photographers and artists as well serving as a respite from modern-day living. Escape houses a state-of-the-art music recording studio and provides a desert landscape for photos shoots. Escape has been visited by major label artists The Arctic Monkeys, Paolo Nutini, Rufus du Sol, 5SOS, Billy Gibbons, Diplo, Jan Blomqvist, Bob Moses, MK, Joe Ray of Nero, Shigeto, The Pierces, Eagles of Death Metal, Peaches, the Smirnoff Sound Collective, and author Neil Strauss. The ranch has also hosted shoots with Johny Depp and Dior as well as magazines such as Vogue and Glamour.

Charity and community work

Escape for Good
In 2012, Gardner created the Escape for Good series in partnership with New York marketing firm Sunshine Sachs. It is a charity race over 36 hours where contestants travel with no money in support of their favourite cause. The race took place in 2012, 2013, and 2014.

Tile House Project
In 2017, Gardner placed 18,000 tiles on a Venice residential property with New York artist FAILE as a mark of unity within the Venice Community. FAILE House was nominated for House of the Year by the Wall Street Journal at the end of 2020.

Career

Musician
 Chillher (1998–2004) Keyboards. In band with UK recording artist Ben Montague. First record was recorded at Freddie Mercury and Roger Taylor's studio The Mill (home of Queen). Then recorded with Mike Rutherford (Genesis) in Sussex. Opened for Ringo Starr in 2003.
 The Blue Eyed Shark Experiment (2009–2012) Solo Project.  Appeared on own record as The Blue Eyed Shark Experiment, released via Universal and Sidewalk 7 Ltd. The music video for Shark's first single "JetPlane" shot with Spun movie writer Creighton Vero in Sunland, California. It was executive produced by Gardner.
 Your New Crush (2013). Recording with Kelly Halloran and David Catching (Eagles of Death Metal, Earthlings?) and produced by Mathias Schneeberger.
 Hot Trash (2017/2018). Recording with Kelly Halloran. Produced by Stefan Skarbek, Engineer James Krausse, Mix by Henry Krinkle.
 Hot Trash (2022). Recording with Jay Bowman, Dallas Austin, Naz Tokio and Joseph Ray of Nero.  “DON’T RESIST!” was released June 21, 2022, produced by Jean Michel LaPointe and Grammy award winning engineer Mick Gazauski.

Photographer
In 2019, Gardner installed works at the Seminole Hard Rock Hotel and Guitar Hotel in Florida. His collaborative pieces were also featured in the new state of the art Hard Rock Live music venue.

References

External links
 Escape Official site

1979 births
Living people
British businesspeople
People educated at Radley College